A Place in the Sun is a 1951 American drama film based on the 1925 novel An American Tragedy by Theodore Dreiser and the 1926 play, also titled An American Tragedy. It tells the story of a working-class young man who is entangled with two women: one who works in his wealthy uncle's factory, and the other a beautiful socialite. Another adaptation of the novel had been filmed once before, as An American Tragedy, in 1931.  All these works were inspired by the real-life murder of Grace Brown by Chester Gillette in 1906, which resulted in Gillette's conviction and execution by electric chair in 1908.

A Place in the Sun was directed by George Stevens from a screenplay by Harry Brown and Michael Wilson, and stars Montgomery Clift, Elizabeth Taylor, and Shelley Winters; its supporting actors included Anne Revere and Raymond Burr. Burr's performance impressed TV producer Gail Patrick, and would later lead to her casting him as Perry Mason.

The film was a critical and commercial success, winning six Academy Awards and the first-ever Golden Globe Award for Best Motion Picture – Drama. The film is considered one of the greatest American films ever made. In 1991, A Place in the Sun was selected for preservation in the United States National Film Registry by the Library of Congress as being "culturally, historically, or aesthetically significant".

Plot
In 1950, George Eastman, the poor nephew of rich industrialist Charles Eastman, arrives in town following a chance encounter with his uncle while working as a bellhop in Chicago. Although George is regarded as an outsider by the Eastmans, Charles offers George an entry-level job at his factory. George starts dating fellow factory worker Alice Tripp in defiance of the workplace rules. Alice is a poor and inexperienced girl who is dazzled by George and slow to believe that his Eastman name brings him no advantages.

Over time, George begins a slow move up the corporate ladder and is invited by Charles to a social event, where George meets and falls for socialite Angela Vickers, who is also attracted to him. They fall in love. Just as George enters the intoxicating and care-free lifestyle his new life with Angela brings, Alice announces she is pregnant and, unable to procure an abortion, expects George to marry her. George puts Alice off and continues spending more time with Angela without Alice's knowledge. George is invited to Angela's family lake house over Labor Day and tells Alice the visit will advance his career. Alice discovers George's lie after seeing a newspaper photograph of George and Angela boating with friends. Alice calls George at the Vickers home and threatens to come there and reveal herself unless he leaves and returns to her. Shaken, George tells his hosts his mother is sick and he must leave.

The next morning, George and Alice drive to City Hall to get married but it is closed for Labor Day. George is relieved and, remembering Alice cannot swim, begins forming a plan to drown her in the lake by feigning an accident. Alice unsuspectingly agrees to the lake venture. Arriving at the lake, George attempts to cover for the upcoming murder by falsely stranding his car in the woods and renting a rowboat under a false name. While they are out on the lake, Alice talks about her dreams concerning their happy future together with their child. As George apparently takes pity on her, Alice tries to stand up in the boat, causing it to capsize, and Alice drowns.

George escapes, swims to shore, behaves suspiciously when he comes across campers on his way back to the car, and eventually drives to the Vickers' lodge. He fails to report the accident. Alice's body is discovered and her death is treated as a homicide as the evidence against George begins to mount. Just as Angela's father approves Angela's marriage to him, George is arrested and charged with Alice's murder. George's furtive actions before and after Alice's death condemn him. His denials are futile, and he is found guilty of murder and sentenced to death in the electric chair. Near the end, he agrees when the priest suggests that, although he did not kill Alice, he did not act to save her because he was thinking of Angela. The priest then states that, in his heart, it was murder. Angela visits George in prison, saying that she will always love him, and George slowly marches toward his execution.

Cast

 Montgomery Clift as George Eastman
 Elizabeth Taylor as Angela Vickers
 Shelley Winters as Alice Tripp
 Anne Revere as Hannah Eastman
 Keefe Brasselle as Earl Eastman
 Fred Clark as Bellows, defense attorney
 Raymond Burr as Dist. Atty. R. Frank Marlowe
 Herbert Heyes as Charles Eastman
 Shepperd Strudwick as Anthony "Tony" Vickers
 Frieda Inescort as Mrs. Ann Vickers
 Kathryn Givney as Louise Eastman
 Walter Sande as Art Jansen, George's Attorney
 Ted de Corsia as Judge R.S. Oldendorff
 John Ridgely as Coroner
 Douglas Spencer as the Boat Keeper
 Lois Chartrand as Marsha
 Paul Frees as Rev. Morrison
 Kathleen Freeman as Factory Worker/Prosecution Witness (uncredited)
 Ian Wolfe as Dr. Wyeland (uncredited)

Censorship
In a November 14, 1949, letter from the Production Code Administration, Joseph I. Breen pointed out an issue regarding the dialogue between Alice and her doctor. Breen cautioned against direct references to abortion, specifically the line in the script in which Alice says, "Doctor, you've got to help me." In the finished film, the line became, "Somebody's got to help me" and, while abortion is possibly implied, the film does not include any actual mention of it.

In 1965, director Stevens threatened to sue for US$1,000,000 any TV station that inserted any commercial into the running of his film without his specific approval of the ad.

Reception
The film earned an estimated $3.5 million at the U.S. and Canadian box office, and earned critical acclaim in 1951. Upon seeing the film, Charlie Chaplin called it "the greatest movie ever made about America".

One impact of the film was from the Edith Head white party dress with its bust covered with flower blossoms worn by Taylor; it was the most popular prom dress style in the U.S. in 1951 and influenced prom and wedding dress design for the rest of the decade.

The film's acclaim has not completely held up over time. Reappraisals of the film find that much of what was exciting about the film in 1951 is not as potent in the 21st century. Critics cite the soporific pace, the exaggerated melodrama, and the outdated social commentary as qualities present in A Place in the Sun that are not present in the great films of the era, such as those by Alfred Hitchcock and Elia Kazan, although the performances by Clift, Taylor, and Winters continue to receive praise.

Still, many consider the film to be a classic. It was listed at No. 92 in American Film Institute's 1998 list 100 Years...100 Movies, and No. 53 in 100 Years...100 Passions in 2002, while the film holds a strong 81% rating on Rotten Tomatoes from 36 reviews. In 2013, the British Film Institute re-released the picture across the United Kingdom because of its significant merit.

Both appearing briefly in this film, character actors Douglas Spencer (the Boat Keeper) and Paul Frees (the Priest) would also appear together (earlier in 1951) in the film The Thing From Another World. 

Acclaimed writer-director David Mamet, in his book Bambi vs. Godzilla: On the Nature, Purpose, and Practice of the Movie Business, included A Place in the Sun in a list of four "perfect" films, along with The Godfather, Galaxy Quest and Dodsworth.

Awards and nominations

References

Further reading
 Tibbetts, John C., and James M. Welsh, eds. The Encyclopedia of Novels Into Film (2nd ed. 2005) pp 15–17.

External links

 
 
 
 
 A Place in the Sun  at TV Guide
 A Place in the Sun at Filmsite.org
 

1950s American films
1950s English-language films
1951 drama films
1951 films
American black-and-white films
American courtroom films
American drama films
American films based on plays
American legal drama films
Best Drama Picture Golden Globe winners
Censored films
Film noir
Films about social class
Films based on adaptations
Films based on American novels
Films based on works by Theodore Dreiser
Films directed by George Stevens
Films scored by Franz Waxman
Films that won the Best Costume Design Academy Award
Films that won the Best Original Score Academy Award
Films whose cinematographer won the Best Cinematography Academy Award
Films whose director won the Best Directing Academy Award
Films whose editor won the Best Film Editing Academy Award
Films whose writer won the Best Adapted Screenplay Academy Award
Films with screenplays by Harry Brown (writer)
Films with screenplays by Michael Wilson (writer)
Paramount Pictures films
United States National Film Registry films
Works based on An American Tragedy